Parliamentary elections were held in Mauritania on 11 October 1996, with a second round in 16 of the 79 constituencies on 18 October. After the ruling Democratic and Social Republican Party (PRDS) won 60 of the 63 seats decided in the first round, the opposition Union of Democratic Forces boycotted the second round, resulting in the PRDS winning a total of 70 seats. Voter turnout was 52.1%, and only around 30% in Nouakchott.

Results

References

Mauritanian parliamentary election
Parliamentary election
Elections in Mauritania
Mauritanian parliamentary election
Election and referendum articles with incomplete results